The United Fishermen's Union was a trade union in the United Kingdom.

The union was founded in 1923 when the Tyne Steam Packet Provident Society merged with the South Shields Steam Tugboatmen's Provident Society.  It was initially known as the North East Coast Tugboatmen and Fishermen's Association.

The union later renamed itself as the "United Fishermen's Union", and in 1966 it merged into the Transport and General Workers' Union.

See also
 TGWU amalgamations

References

Arthur Ivor Marsh, Victoria Ryan. Historical Directory of Trade Unions, Volume 5 Ashgate Publishing, Ltd., Jan 1, 2006 pg. 436

Defunct trade unions of the United Kingdom
Fishing industry trade unions
Trade unions disestablished in 1966
Transport and General Workers' Union amalgamations